XHRV-FM is a radio station on 89.5 MHz in Matamoros, Tamaulipas, Mexico.

History
XHRV's concession history begins in San Fernando, Tamaulipas. On November 23, 1994, Libertas received the concession for XHSAF-FM 100.9. XHSAF became XHRV-FM on April 27, 1998 (a later XHSAF-FM on the same frequency in the same town was awarded just months later for the Radio Tamaulipas state network).

In 2006, XHRV conducted a move into the Río Grande Valley by soliciting a move to Valle Hermoso.

Between 2012 and 2020, the station aired the Exa FM pop format from MVS Radio.

References

External links

Radio stations in Matamoros, Tamaulipas
Spanish-language radio stations